The third Government of Prime Minister Edi Rama is the 67th ruling Government of the Republic of Albania which was officially mandated by President Ilir Meta on 18 September 2021. Following the 2021 election, the Socialist Party won for the third consecutive time a majority of seats to Parliament and also for the second time in a row the right to form a government without the help of coalitions.

Background 
The government was presented for the first time at the Congress of the Socialist Party by Edi Rama himself. On 14 September 2021, the President decreed the government after a verification made in the judiciary, including SPAK. In the second meeting after the constitution of the new Parliament of Albania on 16 and 17, the ministers, chaired by the PM Rama, presented in a marathon session of 20 hours the governing program, at the end of which they were approved by the parliament. On the 18th the oath was taken before the president and only at noon, the new Council of Ministers gathered for the first time taking its first decisions.

Cabinet
The Rama's III government differs slightly from the end of the previous mandate, making its key posts entrusted to the same ministers again. Ministers such as Belinda Balluku and Ogerta Manastirliu were reconfirmed in previous positions, taking into account the popularity won during the exercise of their duties. Both were ranked high in the polls, especially Ms. Manastirliu, given the pandemic situation of COVID-19, which gave her a lot of popularity with the management of the situation in the country, where despite the criticism prevailed positive reactions.

The new Albanian government was widely praised for the dominance of women in ministerial posts. Out of 17 ministries, 12 will be led by women, making it fifth globally in women's representation in Cabinet, according to the latest United Nations. Rama himself in his speech in parliament described it as “This new government will enter history as the cabinet with the highest number of women”. In this new mandate, Arben Ahmetaj was also reconfirmed in office as Minister of State for Reconstruction and Reform Program, but was also appointed Deputy Prime Minister. Giving importance to the program of reconstruction and recovery from the consequences of the earthquake of November 2019, where damage was done to apartments, schools, cultural and historical objects, as well as infrastructure.

See also
 Politics of Albania
 Council of Ministers of Albania

Notes

References

External links
 Council of Ministers Official website

G67
2021 establishments in Albania
Ministries established in 2021
Cabinets established in 2021
Current governments